Jayakrushna Rajaguru Mohapatra (29 October 1739 – 6 December 1806) popularly known as Jayi Rajaguru was a prominent figure of the Indian independence movement in the state of Odisha. A princely-priest by profession at the court of the Khurda kingdom , Rajaguru revolted against the British East India Company in the province. Whilst collaborating with the Marathas to recapture the British-controlled province, a Maratha messenger was caught by the British and Rajaguru's secret strategies got exposed. Upon failure of his removal from the king's court, a British force attacked the fort of Khurda and captured Rajaguru. He was later sentenced to death and executed in Baghitota, Midnapore.

Early life 
Jayi Rajaguru was born on 29 October 1739 (occasion of Anla nabami as per the Odia calendar) in Biraharekrushnapur, near Puri, Odisha to a Brahmin family, father Chandra Rajaguru and mother Haramani Debi. He was the Royal Priest, Commander-in-Chief and the real administrative representative of the king of Khurda, Gajapati Mukunda Deva-II. He is supposedly known, in written history, as first martyr of India against the British.

Royal responsibilities
Being an excellent scholar in Sanskrit like his grandfather Gadadhara Rajaguru and a great Tantra Sadhaka, he was appointed as the Chief Minister-cum-Rajaguru of Gajapati Dibyasingha Deva in the year 1780 at the age of 41. He was a lifelong bachelor. He was also the royal priest of Gajapati Mukunda Dev-II.

In 1779, during the war between the Khurda King and Januji Bhonsala at Badamba Gada, Narasingha Rajaguru was killed who was handling the army. In this precarious condition Jayi Rajaguru was appointed as the head of the administration and the chief of Army of Khurda and carried out his duties until his death.

Revolt against the intruders

Bargis 
Taking advantage of the weak administration during the battles, the attack of Maratha mercenaries called Bargis  intensified on the people of Khurda. This was intolerable to the patriot Rajaguru. He personally moved from village to village to encourage the moral strength of the Paiks (soldiers). He organized village youths and trained them in military practices and making arms and ammunition. He developed a five-point programme (Panchasutri Yojana) to fight against the Burgis.

British
However, the main trouble started in 1757 when the British won the Battle of Plassey and occupied the provinces of Bengal, Bihar and Medinapur in Odisha. In 1765 they occupied a vast region of Andhra Pradesh from the Parsis and the Nizam of Hyderabad. They built a fort in Ganjam south to Khurda. For the purpose of transportation between Ganjam and Medinapur, they attacked Khurda in 1798 with the help of Shyamsundara Deva, the treacherous brother of the king of Khurda. Even with the sudden death of Khurda King Gajapati Dibyasingha Dev at that particular time, Rajaguru did not let them to succeed in their effort. Rajaguru Supported Mukunda Dev-II and made him the king of Khurda.

The District Magistrate of Ganjam Col. Harcourt made an agreement with the king of Khurda for the communication of Ganjam and Balasore. It was agreed that the British would pay one lakh Rupees ( 1, 00,000) towards compensation to the king and to return the four Praganas which were under the control of the Marathas since 1760 A.D. But, they cheated in both the ways. Rajaguru tried his best to get the both, but was unsuccessful. In 1803–04, he marched with two thousand armed Paiks to Cuttack to collect the money but was only paid  40,000 and was refused to get the Praganas.

Fight
Filled with rage Rajaguru rearranged his army and occupied the four Praganas on his own with an intention to drive the British out of his state, his country. But, the British tried to capture Khurda by force. As a result, in September 1804 the King of Khurda was deprived of the traditional rights of Jagannatha Temple which was a serious shock to the King and the people of Odisha. Consequently, in October 1804 a group of armed Paikas attacked the British at Pipili. This event alarmed the British force. In the meantime, Rajaguru requested all the Kings of the State to join hands for a common cause against the British. The Kings of Kujanga, Kanika, Harishapura, Marichipura and others made an alliance with the King of Khurda and prepared themselves for the battle.

Finally, the historical fight occurred between the military of Khurda and the British. Fight continued for a long period and Rajaguru was arrested from the Khurdha fort and was taken to Barabati fort. He made his all out effort to keep his king safe but finally, Mukunda Deva-II was arrested on 3 January 1805. Then Rajaguru and the King were sent to Midnapore Jail from Cuttack, fearing further violence in the State.

Trial and execution
Considering the petition submitted by the king from the prison, the British counsels released Mukunda Deva-II and sent him to Puri for settlement. The trial of Rajaguru was conducted at Baghitota in Medinapur. He was declared guilty for waging a war "against the lawfully established government of the land". He was ordered to be hanged until death; but was executed on 6 December 1806 in a procedure in which his executioners tied his legs to the opposite branches of a tree and the branches were let off, splitting his body in to two parts.

References

External links
 http://www.orissa.gov.in/e-magazine/Orissareview/dec-2006/engpdf/15-17.pdf
 http://www.orissa.gov.in/e-magazine/Orissareview/dec2005/engpdf/the_celebrated_son_of_the_soil_jayee_rajguru.pdf
 http://www.orissa.gov.in/e-magazine/Orissareview/dec-2006/engpdf/18-20.pdf
 http://www.orissa.gov.in/e-magazine/Orissareview/jan-2007/engpdf/23-25.pdf
 http://orissa.gov.in/e-magazine/Orissareview/2009/October/engpdf/Pages20-23.pdf

1739 births
1806 deaths
Indian independence activists from Odisha
People executed by British India by hanging
Executed Indian people